Vladimir Ivanovich Palladin (– 3 February 1922) was a Russian Empire and Soviet biochemist and botanist, a member of Saint Petersburg of Academy of Sciences. After graduating in 1883 from the Moscow State University, in 1886 he defended a PhD and in 1889 a habilitation on the role of oxygen in metabolism in plants. He later became professor of universities in Kharkiv (1889), Warsaw (1897) and  Saint Petersburg (1901–1914). Palladin is one of the founders of the theory of metabolism in plants and of a school of Russian scientists studying the associated processes. His son Aleksandr Palladin became president of Academy of Sciences of Ukraine.

References

1859 births
1922 deaths
Scientists from Moscow
People from Moskovsky Uyezd
Biochemists from the Russian Empire
Soviet biochemists
Soviet botanists
Botanists from the Russian Empire
Moscow State University alumni